Eva is a 1948 Swedish drama film directed by Gustaf Molander and written by Ingmar Bergman. It was adapted from Bergman's short story "Trumpetaren och vår herre".

Plot
As Bo (Birger Malmsten) returns home from military service, he flashes back to an episode in his childhood where he ran away from home and fell in with a band of performers. One of the performers has a daughter, a blind girl, and seeking to impress her Bo steals a locomotive. The train crashes and the girl is killed. This is first of many intrusions of death into Bo's life.

We also see him dealing with his dying uncle and the body of a German soldier that has washed ashore. This is contrasted with life, as represented by his young lover Eva (Eva Stilberg) and eventually their son. In a Hitchcockian digression, Bo hallucinates killing his friend Göran (Stig Olin) to be with his alluring wife (Eva Dahlbeck).

Bo and Eva escape to a remote island whose only other occupant is a widowed farmer. Eva goes into labor early and Bo and the farmer must fight the current to row her to a hospital. In a montage superimposed over Bo's rowing, we see images from throughout the film, seeming to suggest a struggle between life and death that is going on his mind. Upon his son's birth, Bo feels a resolution to his search for meaning in a cruel world.

Cast
Birger Malmsten as Bo
Eva Stiberg as Eva
Eva Dahlbeck as Susanne
Åke Claesson as Fredriksson
Wanda Rothgardt as Mrs. Fredriksson
Hilda Borgström as Maria
Stig Olin as Göran
Inga Landgré as Frida
Olof Sandborg as Berglund
Carl Ström as Johansson
Sture Ericson as Josef Friedel

References

External links

1948 films
1948 drama films
1940s Swedish-language films
Swedish black-and-white films
Films based on short fiction
Films based on works by Ingmar Bergman
Films directed by Gustaf Molander
Films with screenplays by Ingmar Bergman
Rail transport films
Films set on islands
Films set in the Baltic Sea
Films scored by Erik Nordgren
Swedish drama films
1940s Swedish films